St. Dominic's Priory School is an independent co-educational Catholic Pre, Primary, and High School in Godlonton Avenue in the suburb of Miramar, in Port Elizabeth, Eastern Cape, South Africa. The school was founded in 1900.

History 
In 1867, six foundresses left Dublin and sailed to the missionary station in Port Elizabeth, where they founded the Holy Rosary Convent; it was followed by two other Catholic schools - Marist Brothers College for boys (started by the Marist Brothers) and St Dominic's Priory (started by the Cabra Dominican Sisters).  Holy Rosary Convent, Marist Brothers College and Priory High merged to form Trinity High School, for boys and girls, in 1983. The Trinity High School moved to the Holy Rosary Convent buildings in central Port Elizabeth, while a junior school remained at the Priory. However, in 2000, urban decline and economic factors led to the move of Trinity High School to the Priory buildings when the Holy Rosary buildings were sold.

Notable alumni
 Zolani Mahola, singer of Freshlyground
 Talitha Ndima, actress
 Marguerite Poland, novelist
 Reeva Steenkamp, model and paralegal

See also 
 List of Marist Brothers schools

References

External links 
 

Marist Brothers schools
Catholic schools in South Africa
Private schools in the Eastern Cape
Educational institutions established in 1900
1900 establishments in the Cape Colony
Buildings and structures in Port Elizabeth